David Joseph Griffiths (born 21 November 1983) is an English Christian musician and guitarist, who plays a Christian pop and Christian rock music. He has released two extended plays, Horizons (2005) and The Way Through the Land (2013), and a studio album, Here & Now (2016).

Early life
David Joseph Griffiths was born on 21 November 1983, in Bournemouth, England, where he was raised with brother and fellow band member of Bosh, Michael "Mike" Griffiths.

Music career
His music career began in 1996, with his band, Bosh along with Mike Griffiths, Grant Howard, Matt Gainsford and James Grant. Bosh released several recordings and toured extensively in their later years, finally disbanding in 2011. The first solo project, an extended play, Horizons, was released in 2005. He released, The Way Through The Land, in 2013, another extended play. His first proper studio album, Here & Now, released in 2016.

Discography
Studio albums
 Here & Now (2016)
EPs
 Horizons (2005) 
 The Way Through the Land (2013)

References

External links
 

1983 births
Living people
English Christians
English rock guitarists
English songwriters